The Halaba people (alternate spellings Alaba also called K’abeena are an ethnic group inhabiting the central Ethiopian highlands. The Halaba claim to originate from the Arab cleric, Abadir who settled in Harar. In the middle ages, Halaba were part of the Hadiya state. In the 1400s their Garad (chief) was in conflict with the Abyssnian monarch Zara Yaqob. They are mostly Muslims but there are also some Christians. A map of the region from 1628 shows a Kingdom of Halaba. They speak Halaba-Kʼabeena which is a member of the Highland East Cushitic language within the Afroasiatic family. Garad Side is stated to be a forefather for the Halaba people.

All cultural issues and living conditions are governed by the Halaba People's unique traditional administrative structure, known as "Sera," which is interpreted as law, principle, norms, values, and regulation in the community.

Every January, following the successful crop harvest, the locals colorfully celebrate the "Sera" holiday to uphold this custom.

References

External Link 
Sera Halala
Ethnic groups in Ethiopia